The Reformed Church of Christ in Nigeria was formed in 1973 when a split occurred in the Christian Reformed Church of Nigeria. It consists of people of the Kuteb tribe, through multi-ethnic ministry is being pursued in other areas. In 1979 the church was officially recognised by the Nigerian government. In 1993 the church changed its name from Church of Christ in Nigeria to the current name. Since 1973 the church is growing rapidly. The denomination has about 500,000 members in hundreds of congregation and house fellowships.

Theology
Apostles Creed
Canons of Dort
Heidelberg Catechism
Nicene Creed
Westminster Confession of Faith

Ministers and officers are men only.

Ecumenical organisations
The Reformed Church of Christ in Nigeria is a member of the World Communion of Reformed Churches and the World Council of Churches

References

Reformed denominations in Africa
Members of the World Communion of Reformed Churches
Churches in Nigeria
1973 establishments in Nigeria